Anfin Skaaheim (7 July 1939 – 27 June 2016) was a Norwegian missionary leader.

Skaaheim was born in Torvikbukt in the municipality of Gjemnes. He graduated as cand.theol. from the MF Norwegian School of Theology. He was appointed Secretary General for the Norwegian Christian Student and School Association from 1975 to 1987, for Det norske lutherske Indremisjonsselskap from 1987 to 2000, and for Normisjon from 2001 to 2003.

References

1939 births
2016 deaths
People from Møre og Romsdal
MF Norwegian School of Theology, Religion and Society alumni
Norwegian Christian religious leaders